Kalgoorlie is a city in the Goldfields–Esperance region of Western Australia, located  east-northeast of Perth at the end of the Great Eastern Highway. It is sometimes referred to as Kalgoorlie–Boulder, as the surrounding urban area includes the historic townsite of Boulder and the local government area is the City of Kalgoorlie–Boulder.

Kalgoorlie-Boulder lies on the traditional lands of the Wangkatja group of peoples.The name "Kalgoorlie" is derived from the Wangai word Karlkurla or Kulgooluh, meaning "place of the silky pears".  The city was established in 1893 during the Western Australian gold rushes. It soon replaced Coolgardie as the largest settlement on the Eastern Goldfields. Kalgoorlie is the ultimate destination of the Goldfields Water Supply Scheme and the Golden Pipeline Heritage Trail. The nearby Super Pit gold mine was Australia's largest open-cut gold mine for many years.

At August 2021, Kalgoorlie–Boulder had an estimated urban population of 29,068, a decline from the recent peak of 32,966 in 2013.

History

Kalgoorlie-Boulder lies on the traditional lands of the Wangkatja people. Languages including Wangkatja, part of the Wati language family, continue to be spoken there today.

In the winter of 1893, prospectors Patrick (Paddy) Hannan, Tom Flanagan, and Dan Shea were travelling to Mount Youle, when one of their horses cast a shoe. During the halt in their journey, the men noticed signs of gold in the area around the foot of what is now the Mount Charlotte gold mine, located on a small hill north of the current city, and decided to stay and investigate. On 17 June 1893, Hannan filed a Reward Claim, leading to hundreds of men swarming to the area in search of gold, and Kalgoorlie, originally called Hannan's Find, was born.

The population of the town was 2,018 (1,516 males and 502 females) in 1898.

The mining of gold, along with other metals such as nickel, has been a major industry in Kalgoorlie ever since, and today employs about one-quarter of Kalgoorlie's workforce and generates a significant proportion of its income. The concentrated area of large gold mines surrounding the original Hannan's find is often referred to as the Golden Mile, and was sometimes referred to as the world's richest square mile of earth.

In 1901, the population of Kalgoorlie was 4,793 (3,087 males and 1,706 females) which increased to 6,790 (3,904 males and 2,886 females) by 1903.

The  narrow-gauge Government Eastern Goldfields Railway line reached Kalgoorlie station in 1896, and the main named railway service from Perth was the overnight sleeper train The Westland, which ran until the 1970s. In 1917, a  railway line was completed, connecting Kalgoorlie to Port Augusta, South Australia, across  of desert, and consequently the rest of the eastern states. The standardisation of the railway connecting Perth (which changed route from the narrow-gauge route) in 1968 completed the Sydney–Perth railway, making rail travel from Perth to Sydney possible; the Indian Pacific rail service commenced soon after. During the 1890s, the Goldfields area boomed as a whole, with an area population exceeding 200,000, composed mainly of prospectors. The area gained a reputation for being a "wild west", notorious for its bandits and prostitutes. This rapid increase in population and claims of neglect by the state government in Perth led to the proposition of the new state of Auralia, but with the sudden diaspora after the Gold Rush, these plans fell through.

Places, famous or infamous, for which Kalgoorlie is noted include its water pipeline, designed by C. Y. O'Connor and bringing in fresh water from Mundaring Weir near Perth, its Hay Street brothels, its two-up school, the goldfields railway loopline, the Kalgoorlie Town Hall, the Paddy Hannan statue/drinking fountain, the Super Pit, and Mount Charlotte lookout. Its main street is Hannan Street, named after the town's founder. One of the infamous brothels also serves as a museum and is a major national attraction.

Kalgoorlie and the surrounding district were served by an extensive collection of suburban railways and tramways, providing for both passenger and freight traffic.

In 1989, the Town of Kalgoorlie and Shire of Boulder formally amalgamated to create the City of Kalgoorlie-Boulder, adjoining the two towns into what is now the fifth most populous city in Western Australia.

On 20 April 2010, Kalgoorlie was shaken by an earthquake that reached 5.0 on the Richter scale. The epicentre was 30 km north east of the town. The quake caused damage to a number of commercial hotels and historic buildings along Burt Street in Boulder. The entire Burt St. precinct was evacuated until 23 April. Work in the Superpit and many other mines around Kalgoorlie was stopped. Two people suffered minor injuries as a result of the quake.

Population 

According to the 2016 census, there were 29,873 people in the Kalgoorlie - Boulder Significant Urban Area:
 Aboriginal and Torres Strait Islander people made up 7.3% of the population. 
 65.8% of people were born in Australia. The next most common countries of birth were New Zealand (7.9%), England (2.4%), Philippines (2.2%), South Africa (1.9%) and India (1.2%).   
 78.6% of people spoke only English at home. Other languages spoken at home included Afrikaans (1.3%), Tagalog (1.1%), Filipino (0.7%), Mandarin (0.7%) and Hindi (0.5%). 
 The most common responses for religion were No Religion (33.4%) and Catholic (22.1%).

Geography

Climate 
Kalgoorlie has a semi-arid climate (BSk) with hot summers and mild winters.

Such high temperatures are usually followed by a cool change from the south, and occasionally with a thunderstorm.

Cold, wet days with a maximum below  occur about once every winter. Overnight temperatures fall below freezing about four times in a typical winter. Such events occur on clear nights following a day of cold southerly winds.

Industry and commerce
Kalgoorlie-Boulder is a regional centre and has a Chamber of Commerce and a Chamber of Minerals and Energy.

Mining
Since 1992, Kalgoorlie has been home to the Diggers & Dealers conference, held annually in August. It is Australia's premier international mining conference.

Originally consisting of a large number of underground mines, including the Paringa, Oroya, Brown Hill, Chaffers, and Hainault mines, they were consolidated into a single open pit mine in 1989. A visitor centre overlooks the mine, which operates 24 hours a day, 7 days a week. The mine blasts at 1:00 pm every day, unless winds would carry dust over the town. Each of the massive trucks carries 225 tonnes of rock and the round trip takes about 35 minutes, most of that time being the slow uphill haul. Employees must live in Kalgoorlie; there's no fly-in, fly-out operation. The current life of mine plan covers operation until 2035, with investigations for mine extension ongoing.

Culture
Kalgoorlie-Boulder has a dynamic and diverse cultural scene.

Arts
Kalgoorlie-Boulder has many arts organisations and practising artists.

Sports
Kalgoorlie-Boulder's location, being roughly 600 km from Perth, enjoys high levels of participation in Australian rules football (the Goldfields Football League), netball, basketball, rugby league, soccer, field hockey, and cricket. Other popular sports in Kalgoorlie include tennis, lawn bowls, roller derby, rugby union, and swimming.

Kalgoorlie also has an international squash tournament held every year at the YMCA.

In a statewide sense, the semiprofessional Goldfields Giants basketball team competes in the State Basketball League, and were league champions in 2007 and 2008.

The Goldfields Titans play in the Western Australia Rugby League Harvey Norman Premiership state rugby league competition. Home games are at the Oasis playing fields on Saturday afternoons.

Horse racing is also very popular in the city, and Kalgoorlie-Boulder is home to the internationally recognised annual "Race Round".

Attractions

Given the wealth of its yesteryear, Kalgoorlie features many elaborate heritage buildings that have been retained. Kalgoorlie-Boulder – the largest settlement for many hundreds of kilometres, with many employees at the Super Pit – is the centre of the area's social life. Of particular interest is the Kalgoorlie-Boulder Racecourse, a horse racing venue. Two grass sports ovals and a cinema showing recent international releases are in the area.

Well known in the area are the Kalgoorlie, Geraldton, Perth, and Albany skimpy barmaids, mostly flown in, employed by pubs like Exchange Hotel, who walk around "scantily clad" in bikini, lingerie or burlesque outfits to attract punters and who expect a fee in return.

Historic hotels
Kalgoorlie has historical hotels still in operation:
 Broken Hill Hotel – iconic venue in Boulder  
 Exchange Hotel, Kalgoorlie – situated at Kalgoorlie's main intersection
Kalgoorlie Hotel opposite the Kalgoorlie town hall
 Palace Hotel – also situated at Kalgoorlie's main intersection
 Piccadilly Hotel – suburban pub north of the Kalgoorlie CBD
 Recreation Hotel – a two-storied hotel in Boulder

Many hotels have been put to private use, including:
 Cornwall Hotel, Boulder, extensively damaged during 1934 riots
 Mount Lyall (refurbished as a restaurant 2004, currently a Nando's restaurant)

Hotels that have disappeared from the city include:
 Boulder Block (demolished 1991) (Removed due to Super Pit expansion. This pub had a mine shaft so underground workers could access it.)
 Commercial Hotel (burnt down 3 November 1978)
 Fimiston Hotel (demolished February 1980)
 Foundry Hotel (closed 2005 – damaged by fire 3 July 2008, deliberately lit on fire in 2009, Burnt to the ground 2012)
 Glendevon Hotel (burnt down 1986)
 Golden Eagle (The collapsed balcony of the Golden Eagle hotel on the corner of Lane and Wittenoom St in Boulder.) Damaged by fire then demolished in 2012
 Home from Home Family hotel (burnt in the riots of 1934)
 Oriental Hotel (demolished July 1972)

Suburbs

The Kalgoorlie-Boulder metropolitan area consists of the following suburbs:

 Boulder

Known as the home of the Super Pit, it is one of Kalgoorlie-Boulder's historical suburbs featuring many buildings and landmarks dating as far back as 1882. It was once the central business district for the Town of Boulder, but since amalgamation with Kalgoorlie, it is now more of a historical local centre. Boulder has its own post office, town hall and many hotels along its main thoroughfare, Burt Street. A significant refurbishment has been commenced as part of the 'Royalties for Regions' initiative.
 Broadwood (aka – Hampton Heights)
A new housing suburb located next to the Kalgoorlie-Boulder Airport, which was recently expanded.
 Fairways
This area derives its name from the golf course that once occupied the area. It was released to provide affordable property to a growing population in Kalgoorlie-Boulder. Fairways features a private primary school, church, caravan park and small business.
 Golden Grove (formerly Adeline)
Adeline was originally constructed around 1970 by the State Housing Commission. The suburb was built on the "Radburn concept", with houses facing away from the street and common pathways linking homes. The area has been plagued by antisocial problems. In 2003, a significant urban renewal project was commenced, including the renaming of the suburb to Golden Grove and re-aligning of homes. The project has seen some success but has yet to fully eliminate antisocial problems within the area.
 Hampton Heights
See Broadwood.
 Hannans

Located in Kalgoorlie's far north. Hannans was the first suburb to have its own independent shopping centre ("Hannans Boulevard") which includes a Coles Supermarket. The area also has a primary school and an 18-hole golf course. The original course was not formally grassed but was recently refurbished. Several surrounding golf clubs joined together to form one club known as 'The Goldfields Golf Club'. A dam has been constructed to service what is now a luxury desert golf course and club. Alongside the golf course project has been the development and release of Greenview estate. It lies on the western border of Hannans. This ongoing project has been designed as an environmentally friendly estate, and will eventually consist of over 2000 homes, apartments and facilities such as parks and schools. As one of Kalgoorlie's highest growth areas there has been a proposal for a new alternative route, out of the suburb onto the Kalgoorlie Bypass, to avoid traffic problems on the already heavily used Graeme Street which is a direct route to the city centre. Other developments include 'Karkurla Rise' and 'Karkurla View' which have added an additional 400 homes to the area.
 Kalgoorlie

The central business district. Hannan Street, named after Paddy Hannan, is Kalgoorlie's main street and stretches the length of the suburb. The western side of the suburb consists of housing and some light industry. The eastern side contains retail chains, banks, the police station, court house, restaurants, hotels, tourist attractions, schools, university, and a TAFE.
 Lamington
One of Kalgoorlie's oldest suburbs. Much like other older suburbs, almost every street is parallel with Hannan Street in Central Kalgoorlie. Streets are noticeably wide. It houses North Kalgoorlie Primary School, small businesses, a medical practice, a hotel, tavern and a non-maintained 18-hole golf course.
 Mullingar
Much smaller today than it originally was before the Super Pit expansion, Mullingar is located at the far east end of Lamington, between the northern Goldfields railway and Goldfields Highway.
 O'Connor
Officially O'Connor is the south-east section of the suburb of Somerville. Much of the area is increasingly now known as O'Connor. It is home to a primary school (O'Connor Primary School), a private high school (Goldfields Baptist College), and shopping facilities. It also houses the city's only recreation centre.
 Piccadilly
A narrow suburb following Piccadilly street between Central Kalgoorlie and Lamington. It features the city's regional hospital, small businesses, a hotel, sporting arena and two grassed ovals.
 Somerville
Somerville marks the end of Great Eastern Highway that stretches between Kalgoorlie-Boulder and Perth. Much of the area is now referred to locally as O'Connor. Somerville contains a residential area, schools, retail shops, light industry and some horse stables. In the past it also contained market gardens.
 South Kalgoorlie
Stretching from Boundary Street, Kalgoorlie to Holmes Street, Golden Grove and bordering with Central Kalgoorlie, O'Connor and Golden Grove, South Kalgoorlie is mostly residential but also contains the Kalgoorlie-Boulder Racecourse, schools, some light industrial and small businesses. The suburb was expanded in the mid-1990s to include a sub-division named "Sport of Kings" on Maxwell Street, using a surplus of land from the racecourse.
 Victory Heights
A residential-only subdivision within Fairways estate along Burt Street.
 West Kalgoorlie
Kalgoorlie's main industrial area, it is the first suburb as you approach Kalgoorlie on the Great Eastern Highway. It features the city's airport, as well as small, medium, and heavy industrial areas. Currently under expansion further west (ANZAC Drive Industrial Estate).
 West Lamington
The western tip of Lamington was built in the 1980s. It includes one shop, sporting facilities and an arboretum nature reserve.
 Williamstown
This small existing area features mostly housing with one small primary school. It is also home to the Mount Charlotte gold mine (past production of about 5,000,000 ounces of gold), the Cassidy Shaft and Nanny Goat Hill (Mt Gleddon).

Transport

Rail

The town is located on the main East-West rail corridor across Australia. The Transwa Prospector operates once to twice daily passenger train services from Kalgoorlie to Perth. The Indian Pacific train also stops here, operating weekly in each direction.

Buses
Town bus services are provided by TransGoldfields, there are three town routes as well as school services. Transwa also operates road coaches that service the town.

Air
Commercial air services connect Kalgoorlie-Boulder with Melbourne and Perth, operating out of the Kalgoorlie-Boulder Airport. Airlines that provide regular flights include Alliance Airlines, Qantas, QantasLink and Virgin Australia. There is a locally owned and operated charter company with a flight school, Goldfields Air Services.

Road
Kalgoorlie is linked to Perth by the Great Eastern Highway, and is also on the Goldfields Highway.

Media
Radio

Radio Services available in Kalgoorlie:
ABC Goldfields-Esperance: 6GF 648 AM \ 94.3 FM (Part of the ABC Local Radio Network)
ABC Classic FM: 6ABCFM 95.5 FM;
ABC Radio National: 6ABCRN 97.1 FM
ABC Triple J: 6JJJ 93.5 FM \ 98.7 FM
ABC News: 6PNN 100.3 FM
Hit 97.9 (Commercial Station) 6KAR: 91.9 \ 97.9 FM – Contemporary hit radio format
Triple M (Commercial Station) 6KG: 981 AM \ 92.7 FM – Adult Contemporary / Classic Hits / Talk radio format
Vision Radio Network 1431 AM : Community Narrowcast Station – Christian praise, worship music and talk.
Tjuma Pulka (Media) Aboriginal Corporation : 96.3 FM (Aboriginal Community radio service)
6TAB Racing Radio – 88FM (Live broadcasts of Horse Racing, Greyhound Racing and Harness Racing, with talkback and music played at other times).

Television
Television services available include:
The Australian Broadcasting Corporation (ABC) – ABC TV, ABC TV Plus/ABC Kids, ABC Me, ABC News (digital channels)
The Special Broadcasting Service (SBS) – SBS, SBS Viceland, SBS World Movies, SBS Food, NITV (digital channels)
 GWN7 (Golden West Network), an affiliate station of the Seven Network
 WIN Television, an affiliate station of the Nine Network
 West Digital Television, an affiliate station of the Ten Network (provided jointly by Prime Television and WIN Television)

The programming schedule is mainly the same as the Seven, Nine and Ten stations in Perth with variations for news bulletins, sport telecasts such as the Australian Football League and National Rugby League, children's and lifestyle programs and infomercials or paid programming.

GWN7 maintains a newsroom in the city. The GWN7 bureau provides coverage of the surrounding area for the station's nightly 30-minute news program, GWN7 News, at 5:30pm on weeknights.

A Foxtel subscription television service is available via satellite.

Newspapers

The local newspaper for the Kalgoorlie-Boulder and Goldfields region is The Kalgoorlie Miner.

Newspapers from Perth, including The West Australian and The Sunday Times, are also available, as well as national newspapers such as The Australian and The Australian Financial Review.

Education
There are 10 primary schools, four high schools and one university in the Kalgoorlie-Boulder area.

Primary schools
 Boulder Primary School
 East Kalgoorlie Primary School
 Goldfields Baptist College (private)
 Hannans Primary School
 Kalgoorlie Primary School
 Kalgoorlie School of the Air
 North Kalgoorlie Primary School
 O'Connor Primary School
 O'Connor Education Support Centre
 Saint Joseph's Primary School (private)
 Saint Mary's Primary School (Kalgoorlie Catholic Primary School) (private)
 South Kalgoorlie Primary School

High schools
 Eastern Goldfields College (formerly the Eastern Goldfields Senior High School Senior Campus)
 Eastern Goldfields Education Support Centre
 John Paul College (formerly Prendiville College & Christian Bros. College (amalgamated)) (private)
 Kalgoorlie-Boulder Community High School (formerly the Eastern Goldfields Senior High School Middle School Campus)
 Goldfields Baptist College (Year K–10) (private)

Universities
 Curtin University of Technology – Kalgoorlie Campus (includes the Western Australian School of Mines and Curtin VTEC; formerly Kalgoorlie College)
 University of Western Australia and University of Notre Dame Australia – Rural Clinical School of Western Australia

Notable people
Notable people from or who have lived in Kalgoorlie include:

 Christian de Vietri, artist
Thomas Axford, VC, First World War recipient of the Victoria Cross
 Matt Birney, former WA Leader of the Opposition
 John Bowler, Australian politician from Western Australia
 Leonard Casley, founder of the Hutt River Province.
 John Carroll, VC, First World War recipient of the Victoria Cross
 John Cornell, actor and movie producer, best known for playing Strop on The Paul Hogan Show
 Wendy Duncan, Australian politician from Western Australia
 Rica Erickson, historian, botanist and author
 Dean Fiore, V8 supercar driver
 Brian Hayes, British radio personality
 Steve Johnston, speedway rider
 Sophie Garbin, Netball player for the Australian Diamonds and Collingwood Magpies
 Eileen Joyce, pianist
 Dean Kemp, former Australian rules footballer
 Wallace Kyle, Air Marshall, last leader of RAF Bomber Command
 Walter Lindrum, champion professional billiards player
 Ron Manners, prominent ex–local businessperson
 Barry Marshall, Nobel Prize winner
 Bob Marshall, champion billiards player
 Zaneta Mascarenhas, Labor member for Swan
 Bert Nankiville, swimmer
 Michael Patrizi, V8 supercar driver
 James del Piano, businessman, Italian diaspora aficionado
 Melissa Price, Liberal member for Durack
 Tim Rogers, singer/songwriter
 Dom Sheed, Australian rules footballer
 Grant Stewart, cricketer
 Jenny Talia, singer/songwriter
 Ian Taylor, Deputy Premier of Western Australia 1990–1993
 Elizabeth Truswell, former Chief Scientist at the Australian Geological Survey Organisation
 Terry Walsh, field hockey striker and coach
 Kevin Bloody Wilson, singer and comedian

Images

See also
 Auralia (proposed Australian state with its capital in Kalgoorlie)
 Yilgarn Craton

Notes

References
 Casey, Gavin and Mayman, Ted.(1964) The Mile That Midas Touched Rigby, Adelaide..

Further reading
 100th anniversary of rail link (History of the Eastern Goldfields railway, officially completed on 1 January 1897, to the present, including introduction of the Prospector train on 29 November 1971) Kalgoorlie Miner 1 January 1997, p. 2
 Early Railways in the Kalgoorlie Area, Shepley, W.H. Australian Railway Historical Society Bulletin, November 1965

External links

 City of Kalgoorlie–Boulder official website
 Kalgoorlie official tourism website

1893 establishments in Australia
Populated places established in 1893
Mining towns in Western Australia
Towns in Western Australia
Cities in Western Australia
Australian gold rushes
Goldfields-Esperance
Suburbs of Kalgoorlie-Boulder
City of Kalgoorlie–Boulder
Goldfields Water Supply Scheme